Gha-Mu, also known as Small Flowery Miao and Blue Hmong, are a Miao ethnic group in China. They are from Guizhou and belong to the Hmong people. Many of them are Christians. The number of persons within this group likely exceeds 100,000. They are speakers of the Small Flowery Miao language.

References

Sources 
Gha-Mu in China
Miao, Small Flowery

Hmong
Ethnic groups in China
Guizhou